Cyclopinodes is a genus of marine copepods in the family Cyclopinidae.

References

External links 

 
 Cyclopinodes at the World Register of Marine Species (WoRMS)

Cyclopoida genera